Stereosonic was an annual electronic dance music festival held in Australia in November and early December. Stereosonic was held in Brisbane, Adelaide, Perth, Sydney, and Melbourne, attracting attendances of up to 200,000 patrons nationally featuring the biggest electronic artists in the world.

Stereosonic was a collaboration of two major Australia promoters Totem Industries and Onelove Music Group. In 2010 Totem Industries and Onelove Music Group created Totem Onelove Group, Australia's leading electronic music companies. In 2013 Totem Onelove Group was acquired by U.S. based global electronic music company SFX Entertainment of New York.

As of 2012, it was regarded as Australia's fastest growing music festival. In 2016 however, the event was cancelled with the promise that it would return "bigger and better". The festival did not return in 2017, and no announcements have been made regarding its revival for 2018 or beyond.

Onelove Music Group announced new event – Festival X. It was planned for 2018, but did not happen: "Due to unforeseen last-minute changes in artist availability, the partners involved in Festival X have agreed not to proceed with the 2018 event. We set out to deliver the very best experience and the compromises to the proposed line-up did not meet the vision that we have for FestivalX. More news will follow on our future plans for FestivalX – stay tuned to the website and Facebook page for more information". No event was planned in 2019.

History 
2007: Totem Industries and Onelove Music Group started Stereosonic music festival in Melbourne.

2008: Stereosonic expands and is held in Melbourne, Brisbane, Perth and Adelaide.

2009: Stereosonic was held as a truly national event across (Sydney, Melbourne, Brisbane, Perth and Adelaide).

2010: Totem Industries and Onelove Music officially form the joint company “Totem Onelove Group”. Tiesto headlined Stereosonic for his first Australian festival appearance since 2003.

2011:  The Sydney Stereosonic event was held with the incorporation of ANZ Stadium as the main arena, attracting a crowd of 70,000 people. The Sydney event is the largest single day festival attendance ever in Australia.

2012 : Stereosonic attracts over 200,000 patrons across five Australian capital cities. The festival is awarded the most popular festival in Australia at the inthemix awards.

Totem Onelove partners with AIDs charity, (RED) for the first ever live stream of Stereosonic in an effort to raise awareness of the fight against AIDs.

2013: Totem Onelove Group purchased by SFX Entertainment.

Stereosonic, Australia's premier electronic music festival, expands from a one-day festival to a two-day festival across five Australian capital cities. David Guetta, Calvin Harris and Armin van Buuren lead a lineup of over 350 artists.

Totem Onelove supports leading world AIDS charity for DANCE (RED) SAVE LIVES 2 by supporting the live YouTube stream of Stereosonic Sydney.

Patronage

The festival promoters originally began working in Melbourne nightclubs forming the company Totem OneLove, which was in turn purchased by SFX Entertainment in 2013.

The 2009 event was the first to see all five cities host the event.

The 2011 Stereosonic Sydney was the largest festival ever held in Australia.  60,000 people were in attendance with more than 50 people charged for drug possession offences. The Public Order and Riot Squad were called in after patrons attacked police who were trying to break up fights and to assist with other crowd management issues. That year Stereosonic also sold out in Melbourne and Adelaide.

The 2012 Perth event attracted almost 31,000 people.
The 2012 Melbourne event was attended by around 45,000 people. That event saw the arrest of 92 festival-goers on drugs charges.
In 2013, Stereosonic expanded to a two-day festival format across all five cities, enabling more than 50 international artists and over 300 local emerging Australian acts to perform. This was the first time an Australian festival, held on such a large scale across five cities, had been held on multi-days in densely populated cities. Calvin Harris, David Guetta and Armin van Buuren headlined the event, with the Sydney event streamed online to raise awareness for leading AIDS charity, (RED) on World AIDS Day.

The 2015 Sydney event attracted a crowd of over 48,000, with 69 people being charged for drug supply and possession.

Incidents 
A 25-year-old woman became ill at the 2015 Sydney festival and died in hospital from a drug overdose. A man was arrested on 4 December for supplying the woman with drugs. Also in 2015, a 19-year-old man died at the Adelaide Stereosonic event.

Lineups

2007

Fedde Le Grand
Booka Shade
Trentemoller
DJ Mehdi
Tim Deluxe
Kevin Saunderson

Stacey Pullen
Paul Harris
Vicarious Bliss
Steve Rachmad
Martijn Ten Velden
Klaas
Alex (Chicks on Speed)

Meat Katie
The Potbelleez
John Course
Grant Smilie
Ajax
Acid Jacks
Kaz James

2008

Sneaky Sound System
Paul van Dyk
Carl Cox
PNAU
Midnight Juggernauts
Booka Shade
Infected Mushroom
DJ Hell
Crookers

Kaz James
TV Rock
Vitalic
Japanese Popstars
DJ Funk (ed banger)
Tommie Sunshine
Headman
Don Diablo

Mowgli
Giuseppe Ottaviani
Stu Stone
Sam La More
Dave Nada
Devlin and Darko (BBC/Spank Rock DJs)
Mr Maqs (ed banger)
Ajax

2009

Deadmau5
Axwell
Fedde Le Grand
John Dahlbäck
Crookers
Surkin
The Bloody Beetroots feat MC Justin Pearson
Miss Kittin & The Hacker
Marco Carola
Chicane

Cut Copy DJs
Dragonette
Drop the Lime
Renaissance Man
Alter Ego
Zombie Nation
Umek
Hudson Mohawke
Tim Sweeney (DFA)
The Cobra Snake

Kidda
Juan Kidd
Grant Smillie
Andy Murphy
Acid Jacks
Grafton Primary
Canyons
Knightlife
Bag Raiders

2010

Tiesto
Calvin Harris
Robyn (Cancelled)
Major Lazer
Sebastian Ingrosso
Benny Benassi
Wiley
Ricardo Villalobos
Infected Mushroom
Jeff Mills

Afrojack
Luciano
DJ Sneak
Annie Mac
Caspa and MC Rod Azlan
Giuseppe Ottaviani (GO! Live)
Reboot
DJ T

Optimo
DJ Dan
Congorock
Sied van Riel
Technasia
Russ Chimes
Redshape
L-VIS 1990
Aly and Fila

2011

Armin Van Buuren
Carl Cox
LMFAO
Empire of the Sun
Afrojack
The Bloody Beetroots
Avicii
Benny Benassi
Ferry Corsten
Dirty South
Kaskade
Dash Berlin
Sub Focus live
Andy C
Mr Oizo
Chris C (Aus)

PNAU
Pretty Lights
Annie Mac
Crookers
BT Live
Caspa
MC Dynamite
Claude VonStroke
Datsik
Lucy Love
Bag Raiders
Zombie Nation LED Show
Drop the Lime Band
The 2 Bears (Joe Hot Chip and Raf Daddy)
Guy Gerber

The Gaslamp Killer
Deetron
EDX
Jochen Miller
Arty
Yousef
Madeon
Dream
Peter Van Hoesen
Myon & Shane 54
Destructo
Acid Jack Live
Jon Rundell
MC Stretch
ShockOne
Beni (musician)

2012

Tiesto
Avicii
Calvin Harris
Example (musician)
Carl Cox
Major Lazer
Laidback Luke
Martin Solveig
Dash Berlin
Markus Schulz
Diplo
Sander Van Doorn
Infected Mushroom
Chuckie
Flux Pavilion
Mr Oizo
Porter Robinson
Chris C (Aus)

Loco Dice
Bassnectar
JFK MSTRKRFT
Excision (musician)
Adam Beyer
Aly and Fila
Caspa
Datsik
Joris Voorn
Bingo Players
Tommy Trash
Simon Patterson
Gesaffelstein
Orjan Nilsen
Dillon Francis
Foreign Beggars

Zedd
Brodinski
Krewella
Nina Kraviz
Van She
Alvin Risk
Destructo
MaRLo
Club Cheval
Treasure Fingers
French Fries
Beni (musician)
Duke Dumont
Mickey
Kaz James
Feenixpawl
Acid Jack

2013
Headline acts for the 2013 festivals include David Guetta, Calvin Harris, Armin Van Buuren.

Above & Beyond
Acid Jacks
Afrojack
Alesso
Aly & Fila B2B John O'Callaghan
Andrew Rayel
Andy C
Axwell
Bingo Players
Boys Noize
Breach
Bryan Kearney
Burns
Cajmere
Claude VonStroke
Clockwork
Destructo
DJ Falcon
DJedjotronic
Doctor P
Dog Blood
Drumsound & Bassline Smith
Empire of the Sun
Ferry Corsten

Feenixpawl
Flight Facilities
Fritz Kalkbrenner
Gareth Emery
Generik
Giuseppe Ottaviani
Heatbeat
Hot Natured
Hot Since 82
Infinity Ink
Jamie Jones
Jochen Miller
Justin Martin
Kaz James
Chris C (Aus)
Krewella
Labrinth
Late Nite Tuff Guy
Lee Foss
Lemaitre
M4sonic
Maceo Plex
MarLo
Mat Zo
Matrix & Futurebound

Nero
Nick Thayer
Nicky Romero
Noisia & Foreign Beggars Presents I Am Legion
RL Grime
Robert Delong
Sebastian Ingrosso
Shock:One
Showtek
Solarstone
Solomun
Stafford Brothers
Sunnery James Ryan Marciano
The Bloody Beetroots
TJR
Tommie Sunshine
Tommy Trash
UZ
What So Not
W&W
Will Sparks
Zedd

2013 Arenas
Full on Ferry
Hot Creations
HARD
UKF

2014

Calvin Harris
Tiësto
Diplo
Disclosure (DJ Set)
W&W
DJ Snake
Duke Dumont
Will Sparks
RL Grime
Peking Duk
NERVO
Cedric Gervais
Cosmic Gate
Andrew Rayel
Tale Of Us
Destructo
Ørjan Nilsen
Nina Kraviz
Oliver Heldens
Wilkinson
Scuba
Cash Cash
Kölsch
MaRLo

Mano Le Tough
Shogun
Uberjak'd
Mark Sixma
Slumberjack
Nina Las Vegas
Timmy Trumpet
M4SONIC
Tigerlily
Generik
Carmada (L D R U & Yahtzel)
Skrillex
Alesso
Steve Aoki
Showtek
Dash Berlin
Carl Cox
Porter Robinson (Live)
Laidback Luke
New World Punx
TJR
Ferry Corsten
Noisia
Deorro

Headhunterz
MK
DVBBS
Booka Shade (Live)
Markus Schulz
What So Not
Joel Fletcher
John O'Callaghan
Foreign Beggars
Hot Since 82
Alison Wonderland
Crookers
Jack Beats
The Aston Shuffle
Route 94
Simon Patterson
Alex Metric
Deetron
Kaz James
Ilan Bluestone
Acid Jacks
Nick Thayer
ZHU

2015
Stereosonic 2015 reverted to a 1-day event unlike the 2013 and 2014 events which were run over 2 days.

Armin van Buuren
Major Lazer
Axwell Λ Ingrosso
Showtek
Oliver Heldens
Galantis
Diplo
DJ Snake
Duke Dumont
Will Sparks
Peking Duk
Mashd N Kutcher
Tchami
Generik
What So Not
Carnage
Carmada
Jauz

Slumberjack
Clean Bandit (live)
Gareth Emery
Andrew Rayel
MaRLo
Andrew Bayer
Emma Hewitt
Headhunterz
Mark Sherry
Jason Ross
Exis
Dan Burke
MK
Claptone (immortal – live)
Claude VonStroke
Hannah Wants
Patrick Topping
Shiba San

Cut Snake
Hot Dub Time Machine
Timmy Trumpet
SHOCKONE
Snails
Jessie Andrews
Tigerlily
Glover
Yolanda Be Cool
JDG
Joel Fletcher
Samuel James
Kyro
Andy Murphy
Brynny
Scndl
Who Killed Mickey
Matt Watkins

Awards
inthemix Annual Awards

2014
 Winner Best Major Festival

2013
 Winner Best Major Festival (First year Inthemix has awarded nationally instead of state by state)

2012
Winner Favourite Festival – New South Wales
Winner Favourite Festival – South Australia
Winner Favourite Festival – Victoria
Runner-up Favourite Festival – Western Australia
Runner-up Favourite Festival – Queensland

2011
Winner Favourite Festival – Victoria
Winner Favourite Festival – South Australia
Winner Favourite Festival – Western Australia
Runner-up Favourite Festival – New South Wales
Runner-up Favourite Festival – Queensland

2010
Winner Favourite Festival – Victoria
Winner Favourite Festival – Western Australia
Runner-up Favourite Festival – South Australia
Runner-up Favourite Festival – Queensland

See also

List of electronic music festivals
Creamfields Australia

References

External links
 

Music festivals established in 2007
Concert tours
Summer festivals
Electronic music festivals in Australia
Festivals in Brisbane
Festivals in Adelaide
Festivals in Perth, Western Australia
Festivals in Melbourne
Festivals in Sydney